The  is a geopark covering the whole territory of Samani in Japan's northern island of Hokkaidō. The area was declared a Japanese Geopark in 2008, and a UNESCO Global Geopark in 2015.

Geology 

Mount Apoi is part of the Hidaka Mountains, a mountain range in southeastern Hokkaidō which was formed from a collision between two continental plates 13 million years ago. The relatively fresh peridotites on and around Mt. Apoi offer a rare visible glimpse of the Earth's mantle, thrust up from the depths of the earth by global-scale dynamic ground movement.

Vegetation 

Mt. Apoi provides habitats for alpine vegetation due to its unique soil, weather and geographical conditions. It is home to Hidakaso (Callianthemum miyabeanum) and a host of other endemic species. The area's alpine plant communities have been collectively designated as a Special Natural Monument of Japan.

Global Geoparks Network members
Geoparks in Japan
UNESCO

References